Walter Lyon may refer to:
Walter Lyon (poet) (1886–1915), war poet
Walter Lyon (cricketer) (1841–1918), English cricketer
Walter Lyon (footballer) (1879–1964), Australian footballer
Walter Lyon (politician) (1853–1933),  Lieutenant Governor of Pennsylvania